The Ministry of Information and National Guidance of the Republic of Somaliland)  is a Somaliland government ministry which is responsible and concerned about Information, broadcasting, and national guidance.
The current minister is Suleiman Yusuf Ali (Koore).

Overview
Dawan newspaper, Somaliland National TV, Radio Hargeisa and the Somaliland News Agency are government operated news broadcasting agencies under the Ministry of Information.

Ministers of Information

See also

 Cabinet of Somaliland
 Media of Somaliland
 Politics of Somaliland

References

External links

Politics of Somaliland
Government ministries of Somaliland
1992 establishments in Somaliland